Embassy of Russia in Tallinn is the diplomatic mission of Russia in Estonia.

History 
The embassy building is situated in the old medieval quarter of Tallinn Old Town. It was originally built around 1890 as a house and underwent several renovations before becoming an embassy. It was declared a cultural heritage monument in 1997.

The building was first a Soviet embassy in 1921. After WWII it was in use by the Soviet Ministry of the Interior. The Estonian Embassy in Moscow and the Russian Embassy in Tallinn have been operating since independence in 1991, but until 2004 the ownership of buildings and plots owned by embassies and the conditions for their use were unregulated and a draft agreement was made to transfer ownership of the properties. It is unknown whether the draft was signed by either party.

Following the Russian Federation's annexation of Crimea in 2014, demonstrations in support of Ukraine were held in front of the embassy to express solidarity with Ukraine and disdain for the annexation.

diplomatic relations between the two nations soured in the prelude to and during the 2022 Russian invasion of Ukraine. Estonia joined Latvia and Lithuania to expel Russian diplomats in March 2022. In retaliation, the Russian Embassy posted on its facebook page that Estonian diplomats would be expelled from Russia.

In April 2022, demonstrations in support of Ukraine where held again in front of the embassy in response to allegations of rape and sexual assault by Russian forces in Ukraine.

Previous ambassadors

 1992–1997 Aleksandr Trofimov
 1997–2000 Aleksei Gluhkhov
 2001–2006 Konstantin Provalov
 2006–2010 Nikolai Uspensky
 2010–2015 Yuri Merzlyakov
 2015–2021 Aleksandr Petrov
 2022 Vladimir Lipayev

See also 
 Russia–Estonia relations
 Foreign relations of Estonia
 Foreign relations of Russia
 Embassy of Estonia, Moscow
 List of diplomatic missions of Russia

References

Tallinn
Russia
Estonia–Russia relations
Tallinn Old Town